Maba (Maban, Mabang) is a Maban language spoken in Chad and Sudan. It is divided into several dialects, and serves as a local trade language. Maba is closely related to the Masalit language.

Phonology

Vowels 

 /ɛ, ɛː/ and /ɔ, ɔː/ may be realized as more close [e, eː] and [o, oː], when found in open syllable positions.
 Vowels may also be marginally realized as nasal when in nasal environments.

Consonants 

 Stop sounds /b, t, k/ are heard as unreleased [p̚, t̚, k̚] when in word-final position.
 Sounds [p, h] are heard mostly as a result of loanwords. [z] is also mostly from Arabic loanwords, but also may occur in some native words as well.
 /t, d, ⁿd/ when preceding a tap /ɾ/, are then heard as retroflex [ʈ, ɖ, ᶯɖ]. 
 /ɾ/ may also be heard as a trill [r] in free variation.

References

Further reading
Mabaan dictionary

Maban languages
Languages of Chad